James Anthony Walsh (February 24, 1867 – April 14, 1936) was the co-founder of Maryknoll Fathers and Brothers.

Background 
The son of James and Hanna Shea Walsh, James Anthony was born in Cambridge, Massachusetts. After completing his elementary education in the public schools, he attended Boston College High School where, in extracurricular activities, his skills in debating and journalism were first recognized and developed. He began his college program at Boston College, interrupted it to study bookkeeping, transferred to Harvard College as a "special student," and completed his studies at St. John's Seminary in Brighton, Boston. He was ordained on May 20, 1892, at the Cathedral of the Holy Cross in Boston. 
 
After ordination, Walsh was appointed curate at St. Patrick's Church in Roxbury, where he directed sodalities and organizations for both the young men and women of the parish. In 1903, he was appointed Diocesan Director of the Society for the Propagation of the Faith and in 1907 founded The Field Afar magazine, a monthly publication about the foreign missions of the Catholic Church.

Walsh's interest in the foreign missions led to his founding, together with Rev. Thomas Frederick Price, the Catholic Foreign Mission Society of America (C.F.M.S.A.) (commonly referred to as the Maryknoll Fathers and Brothers) in 1911. 

He acted as spiritual father and co-founder, with Mother Mary Joseph Rogers, of the Foreign Mission Sisters of St. Dominic (now called Maryknoll Sisters of St. Dominic). He served as Superior General of the Maryknoll Fathers and Brothers until he died in 1936. During the founding process and in his service as Superior General, Walsh made trips across the United States, Rome, and other places throughout the world.

In 1933, Walsh was named to the episcopacy as Titular Bishop of Seine. He was consecrated in Rome on June 29, 1933, in the College of Propaganda Fide by Cardinal Fumasoni-Biondi. He died at Maryknoll New York, on April 14, 1936. His teachings as a priest gave students strong encouragement to follow their dreams in life.

Bibliography

Writings 
 Choral Sodality Handbook (1898,1955)
 A Modern Martyr (1907)
 Thoughts from Modern Martyrs (1908)
 
 In the Homes of Martyrs (1922)

Biography 
 All the Day Long, Daniel Sargent (1941) Longmans, Green & Company

References

1867 births
1936 deaths
20th-century Roman Catholic bishops in the United States
American Servants of God
Boston College alumni
Boston College High School alumni
Catholics from Massachusetts
Founders of Catholic religious communities
Harvard College alumni
Maryknoll bishops
Writers from Cambridge, Massachusetts